Orcas or killer whales have a cosmopolitan distribution and several distinct populations or types have been documented or suggested. Three to five types of orcas may be distinct enough to be considered different races, subspecies, or possibly even species (see Species problem). The IUCN reported in 2008, "The taxonomy of this genus is clearly in need of review, and it is likely that O. orca will be split into a number of different species or at least subspecies over the next few years." Although large variation in the ecological distinctiveness of different orca groups complicate simple differentiation into types. Mammal-eating orcas in different regions were long thought likely to be closely related, but genetic testing has refuted this hypothesis.

Northern waters

North Pacific
Research off the west coast of Canada and the United States in the 1970s and 1980s identified the following three types:

Resident: These are the most commonly sighted of the three populations in the coastal waters of the northeast Pacific. Residents' diets consist primarily of fish and sometimes squid, and they live in complex and cohesive family groups called pods. Female residents characteristically have rounded dorsal fin tips that terminate in a sharp corner. They visit the same areas consistently. British Columbia and Washington resident populations are amongst the most intensively studied marine mammals anywhere in the world. Resident orcas can be divided into at least three distinct communities; northern, southern and southern Alaskan. Southern Alaskan resident orcas are distributed from southeastern Alaska to the Kodiak Archipelago and number over 700 individuals. These whales consist of two interbreeding clans distinguished by acoustic calls and whose ranges overlap. The northern resident community lives in coastal and inland waters from southeastern Alaska to Vancouver Island. It consists of three clans and 16 pods and number over 300 orcas total. The southern resident community generally inhabits the inland waters of southern British Columbia and Washington, but can be found in the outer waters off Vancouver Island, Washington, Oregon and California. They consist of one clan and three pods, and number less than 80 individuals and are listed as endangered.

Transient or Bigg's: The diets of these orcas consist almost exclusively of marine mammals. They live in the same areas as residents, but the two avoid each other. Transients generally travel in small groups, usually of two to six animals, and have less persistent family bonds than residents. Transients vocalize in less variable and less complex dialects. Female transients are characterized by more triangular and pointed dorsal fins than those of residents. The grey or white area around the dorsal fin, known as the "saddle patch", often contains some black colouring in residents. However, the saddle patches of transients are solid and uniformly grey. Transients roam widely along the coast; some individuals have been sighted in both southern Alaska and California. Transients are also referred to as Bigg's orca in honour of cetologist Michael Bigg. The term has become increasingly common and may eventually replace the transient label. The transient ecotype is estimated to have diverged 700,000 years ago. There are at least three different "stocks" of transients off North America, the AT1 stock which occurs from Prince William Sound to Kenai Fjords, the Gulf of Alaska/Aleutian Islands/Bering Sea (GOA/AI/BS) stock and the west coast stock which ranges from southeast Alaska to California. AT1 is considered a depleted stock; it was affected by the Exxon Valdez oil spill and declined from 22 individuals to eight between 1989 and 2004. The GOA/AI/BS stock may number around 500 whales while the west coast transients number over 320 orcas with over 200 along southeast Alaska, British Columbia and Washington and over 100 orcas off California. California transients do not appear to intermingle much with those further north and west coast transients may be divided into sub-communities.
Offshore: A third population of orcas in the northeast Pacific was discovered in 1988, when a humpback whale researcher observed them in open water. As their name suggests, they travel far from shore and feed primarily on schooling fish. However, because they have large, scarred and nicked dorsal fins resembling those of mammal-hunting transients, it may be that they also eat mammals and sharks. They have mostly been encountered off the west coast of Vancouver Island and near Haida Gwaii. Offshores typically congregate in groups of 20–75, with occasional sightings of larger groups of up to 200. Little is known about their habits, but they are genetically distinct from residents and transients. Offshores appear to be smaller than the others, and females are characterized by dorsal fin tips that are continuously rounded.

Separate fish-eating and mammal-eating orca communities also exist off the coast of the Russian Far East and Hokkaido, Japan. Russian orcas are commonly seen around the Kamchatka Peninsula and Commander Islands. Over 2,000 individual resident-like orcas and 130 transient-like orcas have been identified off Russia. At least 195 individual orcas have been cataloged in the eastern tropical Pacific, ranging from Baja California and the Gulf of California in the north to the northwest coast of South America in the south and west towards Hawaii. Orcas appear to regularly occur off the Galápagos Islands. Orcas sighted in Hawaiian waters may belong to a greater population in the central Pacific.

North Atlantic and adjacent

At least 15,000 whales are estimated to inhabit the North Atlantic. In the Northeast Atlantic, two orca ecotypes have been proposed. Type 1 orcas consist of seven haplotypes and include herring-eating orcas of Norway and Iceland and mackerel-eating orcas of the North Sea, as well as seal-eating orcas off Norway. Type 2 orcas consist of two haplotypes, and mainly feed on baleen whales.  

In the Mediterranean Sea, orcas are considered "visitors", likely from the North Atlantic, and sightings become less frequent further east. However, a small year-round population exists in the Strait of Gibraltar, which numbered around 39 in 2011. Distinct populations may also exist off the west coast of tropical Africa, which have generalized diets.

The northwest Atlantic population is found year-round around Labrador and Newfoundland, while some individuals seasonally travel to the waters of the eastern Canadian Arctic when the ice has melted. Sightings of these whales have been documented as far south as Cape Cod and Long Island. This population is possibly continuous with orcas sighted off Greenland. Orcas are sighted year-round in the Caribbean Sea, and an estimated 267 (as of 2020) is documented in the northern Gulf of Mexico.

North Indian Ocean
Over 50 individual whales have been cataloged in the northern Indian Ocean, including two individuals that were sighted in the Persian Gulf in 2008 and off Sri Lanka in 2015.

Southern waters

A small population of orcas seasonally visits the northern point of the Valdes Peninsula on the east coast of Argentina and hunt for sea lions and elephant seals on the shore, temporary stranding themselves. Off South Africa, a distinctive "flat-tooth" morphotype exists and preys on sharks. A pair of male orcas, Port and Starboard, have become well known for hunting great whites and other sharks off the South African coast.

Orcas occur throughout the waters of Australia, New Zealand and Papua New Guinea. They are sighted year round in New Zealand waters, while off Australia, they are seasonally concentrated off the northwest, in the inshore waters of Ningaloo Reef, and the southwest, at the Bremer region. Genetic evidence shows that the orcas of New Zealand, and northwest and southwest Australia form three distinct populations. New Zealand orcas mainly prey on sharks and rays.

Antarctic
Around 25,000 orcas are estimated around the Antarctic, and four types have been documented. Two dwarf species, named Orcinus nanus and Orcinus glacialis, were described during the 1980s by Soviet researchers, but most cetacean researchers are skeptical about their status, and linking these directly to the types described below is difficult.

Type A or Antarctic orcas look like a "typical" orca, a large, black-and-white form with a medium-sized white eye patch, living in open water and feeding mostly on minke whales.
Type B1 or pack ice orcas are smaller than type A.  It has a large white eye patch. Most of the dark parts of its body are medium grey instead of black, although it has a dark grey patch called a "dorsal cape" stretching back from its forehead to just behind its dorsal fin. The white areas are stained slightly yellow. It feeds mostly on seals. Type B1 orca are abundant between Adelaide Island and the mainland Antarctic peninsula.
Type B2 or Gerlache orcas are morphologically similar to Type B1, but smaller. This ecotype has been recorded feeding on penguins and seals, and is often found in the Gerlache Strait.
Type C or Ross Sea orcas are the smallest ecotype and live in larger groups than the others.  Its eye patch is distinctively slanted forwards, rather than parallel to the body axis. Like type B, it is primarily white and medium grey, with a dark grey dorsal cape and yellow-tinged patches. Its only observed prey is the Antarctic cod.
Type D or Sub-Antarctic orcas were first identified based on photographs of a 1955 mass stranding in New Zealand and six at-sea sightings since 2004. The first video record of this type was made in 2014 between the Kerguelen and Crozet Islands, and again in 2017 off the coast of Cape Horn, Chile. It is recognizable by its small white eye patch, narrower and shorter than usual dorsal fin, bulbous head (similar to a pilot whale), and smaller teeth. Its geographic range appears to be circumglobal in sub-Antarctic waters between latitudes 40°S and 60°S. Although its diet is not determined, it likely includes fish, as determined by photographs around longline vessels, where Type D orcas appeared to be preying on Patagonian toothfish (Dissostichus eleginoides).

Types B and C live close to the ice, and diatoms in these waters may be responsible for the yellowish colouring of both types. Mitochondrial DNA sequences support the theory that these are recently diverged separate species. More recently, complete mitochondrial sequencing indicates the types B and C be recognized as distinct species, as should the North Pacific transients, leaving the others as subspecies pending additional data. Advanced methods that sequenced the entire mitochondrial genome revealed systematic differences in DNA between different populations. A 2019 study of Type D orcas also found them to be distinct from other populations and possibly even a unique species.

References

Sources

Biogeography
Orcas
Population ecology
Population genetics